Jackie Lovely (born 1964/1965)  is a Canadian politician who was elected in the 2019 Alberta general election to represent the electoral district of Camrose in the 30th Alberta Legislature. She is a member of the United Conservative Party. She was appointed parliamentary secretary to the Associate Minister of Status of Women on November 23, 2021

Essay contest controversy 
On August 10, 2022, Lovely confirmed to CBC News that she and Jackie Armstrong-Homeniuk were part of a judging panel that awarded $200 to an essay that supported the Great Replacement conspiracy theory. The entry finished third and was attributed to someone called S. Silver.

The essay called immigration "a sickly mentality that amounts to a drive for cultural suicide," that women are “not exactly” equal to men, and that it was "misguided" and "harmful" to let women have careers traditionally dominated by men. The essay also proposed financial incentives to boost birth rates, and awarding medals to women with more than two children.

The essay was submitted in the Her Vision Inspires contest, a contest announced in February that was a partnership between the Legislative Assembly of Alberta and the Commonwealth Women Parliamentarians Canadian Region. Young women between the ages of 17 and 25 were asked to describe their "unique vision for Alberta" and what they would do if they were elected to be an MLA. It was first spotted by NDP MLA Janis Irwin, who posted screenshots of the essay to her Twitter account on August 8, 2022.

Lovely apologized for her role in the essay contest. Neither her or Armstrong-Homeniuk explained how the essay was chosen. She confirmed her role in the contest one day after she won her nomination for the Camrose riding ahead of the 2023 Alberta general election.

Electoral history

2012 general election

2015 general election

2019 general election

References

United Conservative Party MLAs
Living people
Women MLAs in Alberta
Year of birth uncertain
21st-century Canadian politicians
21st-century Canadian women politicians
Year of birth missing (living people)